Quentin is a French masculine given name derived from the Latin first name Quintinus, a diminutive form of Quintus, which means "the fifth".

People
Saint Quentin (died c. 287)
Quentin Anderson (1912–2003), American literary critic and cultural historian
Quentin Bajac (born 1965), French curator and historian of photography
Quentin Bataillon (born 1993), French politician
Quentin Blake (born 1932), illustrator, famous for his work in Roald Dahl books
Quentin Bryce (born 1942), the 25th Governor-General of Australia
Quentin N. Burdick (1908-1992), American lawyer and senator from North Dakota
Quentin Leo Cook, a.k.a. Fatboy Slim, British musician
Quentin Cooper (born 1961) a science journalist, and broadcaster.
Quentin Crisp (1908-1999), author and social critic
Quentin Davies, Baron Davies of Stamford (born 1944), British politician
Quentin Dean (1944-2003), American actress
Quentin Dupieux, a.k.a. Mr. Oizo, French musician, music producer and film director
Quentin Elias, French singer and gay pornographic actor
Quentin Fillon Maillet (born 1992), French biathlete
Quentin Gause (born 1992), American football player
Quentin Grimes (born 2000), American basketball player
Quentin Hubbard (1954-1976), son of the founder of the Church of Scientology
Quentin Hughes (cricketer) (born 1974), English cricketer
Quentin Jackson (1909-1976), American jazz trombonist
Quentin Jammer (born 1979), American National Football League football player
Quentin Kawānanakoa (born 1961), American politician
Quentin Kenihan (1975–2018), Australian disability advocate, comedian and actor
Quentin Keynes (1921-2003), British explorer and bibliophile
Quentin Lafargue (born 1990), French racing cyclist
Quentin Lake (born 1999), American football player
Quentin Lee, Chinese-Canadian film director
Quentin Oliver Lee (1988-2022), American actor
Quentin Letts (born 1963), British journalist
Quentin Matsys (1466–1529), Flemish painter
Quentin McCord (1978-2020), American football player
Quentin Metsys the Younger (c. 1543–1589), Flemish Renaissance painter; grandson of the above
Quentin Meillassoux (born 1967), French philosopher
Quentin Moses (born 1983), American football player
Quentin Mosimann (born 1988), French-Swiss singer-DJ
Quentin Neujahr (born 1971), American football player
Quentin Poling (born 1994), American football player
Quentin Pryor (born 1983), American basketball player
Quentin Reynolds (1902-1965), American journalist and war correspondent
Quentin Richardson (born 1980), American National Basketball Association player
Quentin Riggins (born 1966), American player of gridiron football
Quentin Roosevelt (1897-1918), son of US President Theodore Roosevelt
Quentin Skinner (born 1940), English professor and historian
Quentin Smith, American philosopher
Quentin Smythe (1916–1997), South African recipient of the Victoria Cross
Quentin Tarantino, American film director, screenwriter, producer, cinematographer and actor
Quentin Westberg, French-Canadian Americans footballer
Quentin Williams (1983-2023), American politician
Quentin Willson (born 1957), British TV presenter and motoring journalist
Quentin Young (1923–2016), American physician and social justice activist, primarily relating to healthcare

Fictional characters
Quentin Beck, a.k.a. Mysterio, a supervillain, enemy of Spider-Man
Quentin "Q" Coldwater, the main character in Lev Grossman's book The Magicians and its TV adaptation
Quentin Collins, a main character on the ABC soap opera Dark Shadows
Quentin Compson, a main character in William Faulkner's The Sound and the Fury and Absalom, Absalom!; also the name of that character's niece
Quentin Costa, on the television show Nip/Tuck
the title character of the Sir Walter Scott novel Quentin Durward and the film adaptation
Quentin Fleming, on the TV show American Horror Story: Coven
Quentin Glass, in the film The Punisher
Quentin "Q" Jacobsen, the protagonist of John Green's novel Paper Towns
Quentin Kelly, on the sitcom Grace Under Fire
Quentin Kirrin, from Enid Blyton's The Famous Five novel series
Quentin Larry Lance, on the TV show Arrow
Quentin Quire, Marvel Comics character
Quentin Sainz, on the TV show Suits
Quentin Seller, an antagonist in the 2022 film Vengeance
Quentin Smith, in the 2010 film A Nightmare on Elm Street
Quentin Travers, on the television program Buffy the Vampire Slayer
Quentin, the seventeenth child in Edward Gorey's book The Gashlycrumb Tinies
Quentin, a cog in the Conker video game series, also known as Carl

See also
Quentin (surname)
Quenton (disambiguation)
Quinten (disambiguation)
Quinton (disambiguation)
Quentyn Martell, in the  A Song of Ice and Fire fantasy novel series

References  

English masculine given names

pcd:Kintin
pl:Kwintyn